

Events

Pre-1600
105 BC – Cimbrian War: Defeat at the Battle of Arausio accelerates the Marian reforms of the Roman army of the mid-Republic.
69 BC – Third Mithridatic War: The military of the Roman Republic subdue Armenia.
AD 23 – Rebels decapitate Wang Mang two days after his capital was sacked during a peasant rebellion.
404 – Byzantine Empress Eudoxia dies from the miscarriage of her seventh pregnancy.
 618 – Transition from Sui to Tang: Wang Shichong decisively defeats Li Mi at the Battle of Yanshi.
1539 – Spain's DeSoto expedition takes over the Apalachee capital of Anhaica for their winter quarters.
1600 – Euridice, the earliest surviving opera, receives its première performance, beginning the Baroque period.

1601–1900
1683 – Immigrant families found Germantown, Pennsylvania in the first major immigration of German people to America.
1762 – Seven Years' War: The British capture Manila from Spain and occupy it.
1777 – American Revolutionary War: British forces capture Forts Clinton and Montgomery on the Hudson River.
1789 – French Revolution: King Louis XVI is forced to change his residence from Versailles to the Tuileries Palace.
1810 – A large fire destroys a third of all the buildings in the town of Raahe in the Grand Duchy of Finland.
1849 – The execution of the 13 Martyrs of Arad after the Hungarian war of independence.
1854 – In England the Great fire of Newcastle and Gateshead leads to 53 deaths and hundreds injured.
1884 – The Naval War College of the United States is founded in Rhode Island.
1898 – Phi Mu Alpha Sinfonia, the largest American music fraternity, is founded at the New England Conservatory of Music.

1901–present
1903 – The High Court of Australia sits for the first time.
1908 – The Bosnian crisis erupts when Austria-Hungary formally annexes Bosnia and Herzegovina.
1910 – Eleftherios Venizelos is elected Prime Minister of Greece for the first of seven times.
1915 – Combined Austro-Hungarian and German Central Powers, reinforced by the recently joined Bulgaria launched a new offensive against Serbia under command of August von Mackensen .
  1915   – Entente forces land in Thessaloniki, to open the Macedonian front against the Central Powers.
1920 – Ukrainian War of Independence: The Starobilsk agreement is signed by representatives of the Ukrainian Soviet Socialist Republic and the Makhnovshchina.
1923 – The Turkish National Movement enters Constantinople.
1927 – Opening of The Jazz Singer, the first prominent "talkie" movie.
1939 – World War II: The Battle of Kock is the final combat of the September Campaign in Poland.
1942 – World War II: American troops force the Japanese from their positions east of the Matanikau River during the Battle of Guadalcanal.
1943 – World War II: Thirteen civilians are burnt alive by a paramilitary group in Crete during the Nazi occupation of Greece.
1944 – World War II: Units of the 1st Czechoslovak Army Corps enter Czechoslovakia during the Battle of the Dukla Pass.
1973 – Egypt and Syria launch coordinated attacks against Israel, beginning the Yom Kippur War.
1976 – Cubana de Aviación Flight 455 is destroyed by two bombs, placed on board by an anti-Castro militant group.
  1976   – Premier Hua Guofeng arrests the Gang of Four, ending the Cultural Revolution in China.
  1976   – Dozens are killed by the Thai army in the Thammasat University massacre.
1977 – The first prototype of the Mikoyan MiG-29, designated 9-01, makes its maiden flight.
1979 – Pope John Paul II becomes the first pontiff to visit the White House.
1981 – Egyptian President Anwar Sadat is murdered by Islamic extremists.
  1981   – NLM CityHopper Flight 431 crashes in Moerdijk after taking off from Rotterdam The Hague Airport in the Netherlands, killing all 17 people on board.
1985 – Police constable Keith Blakelock is murdered as riots erupt in the Broadwater Farm suburb of London.
1987 – Fiji becomes a republic.
1995 – The first planet orbiting another sun, 51 Pegasi b, is discovered.
2007 – Jason Lewis completes the first human-powered circumnavigation of the Earth.
2010 – Instagram, a mainstream photo-sharing application, is founded.
2018 – The United States Senate confirms Brett Kavanaugh as a Supreme Court Associate Justice, ending a contentious confirmation process.
2022 – Annie Ernaux is awarded the Nobel Prize in Literature.

Births

Pre-1600
 649 – Yuknoom Yichʼaak Kʼahkʼ (d. around 696)
1289 – Wenceslaus III of Bohemia (d. 1306)
1459 – Martin Behaim, German navigator and geographer (d. 1507)
1510 – John Caius, English physician and academic, co-founded the Gonville and Caius College (d. 1573)
  1510   – Rowland Taylor, English priest and martyr (d. 1555)
1552 – Matteo Ricci, Italian priest and missionary (d. 1610)
1555 – Ferenc Nádasdy, Hungarian noble (d. 1604)
1565 – Marie de Gournay, French writer (d. 1645)
1573 – Henry Wriothesley, 3rd Earl of Southampton, English politician, Lord Lieutenant of Hampshire (d. 1624)
1576 – Roger Manners, 5th Earl of Rutland (d. 1612)
1591 – Settimia Caccini, Italian singer-songwriter (d. 1638)

1601–1900
1610 – Charles de Sainte-Maure, duc de Montausier, French general (d. 1690)
1626 – Géraud de Cordemoy, French historian, philosopher and lawyer (d. 1684)
1716 – George Montagu-Dunk, 2nd Earl of Halifax, English general and politician, Lord Lieutenant of Ireland (d. 1771)
1729 – Sarah Crosby, English preacher, the first female Methodist preacher (d. 1804)
1732 – John Broadwood, Scottish businessman, co-founded John Broadwood and Sons (d. 1812)
1738 – Archduchess Maria Anna of Austria (d. 1789)
1742 – Johan Herman Wessel, Norwegian-Danish poet and playwright (d. 1755)
1744 – James McGill, Scottish-Canadian businessman and philanthropist, founded McGill University (d. 1813)
1767 – Henri Christophe, Grenadian-Haitian king (d. 1820)
1769 – Isaac Brock, English general and politician, Lieutenant Governor of Upper Canada (d. 1812)
1773 – John MacCulloch, Scottish geologist and academic (d. 1835)
  1773   – Louis Philippe I of France (d. 1850)
1801 – Hippolyte Carnot, French politician (d. 1888)
1803 – Heinrich Wilhelm Dove, Polish-German physicist and meteorologist (d. 1879)
1820 – James Caulfeild, 3rd Earl of Charlemont, Irish politician, Lord Lieutenant of Armagh (d. 1892)
  1820   – Jenny Lind, Swedish soprano and actress (d. 1887)
1831 – Richard Dedekind, German mathematician and philosopher (d. 1916)
1838 – Giuseppe Cesare Abba, Italian soldier, poet, and author (d. 1910)
1846 – George Westinghouse, American engineer and businessman, founded the Westinghouse Air Brake Company (d. 1914)
1862 – Albert J. Beveridge, American historian and politician (d. 1927)
1866 – Reginald Fessenden, Canadian engineer and academic, invented radiotelephony (d. 1932)
1874 – Frank G. Allen, American merchant and politician, 51st Governor of Massachusetts (d. 1950)
1876 – Ernest Lapointe, Canadian lawyer and politician, 18th Canadian Minister of Justice (d. 1941)
1882 – Karol Szymanowski, Polish pianist and composer (d. 1937)
1886 – Edwin Fischer, Swiss pianist and conductor (d. 1960)
1887 – Le Corbusier, Swiss-French architect and painter, designed the Philips Pavilion and Saint-Pierre, Firminy (d. 1965)
1888 – Roland Garros, French soldier and pilot (d. 1918)
1891 – Hendrik Adamson, Estonian poet and educator (d. 1946)
1893 – Meghnad Saha, Indian astrophysicist, astronomer, and academic (d. 1956)
1895 – Caroline Gordon, American author and critic (d. 1981)
1896 – David Howard, American film director (d. 1941)
1897 – Florence B. Seibert, American biochemist and academic (d. 1991)
1900 – Vivion Brewer, American activist and desegregationist (d. 1991)
  1900   – Willy Merkl, German mountaineer (d. 1934)
  1900   – Stan Nichols, English cricketer (d. 1961)

1901–present
1901 – Eveline Du Bois-Reymond Marcus, German-Brazilian zoologist and academic (d. 1990)
1903 – Ernest Walton, Irish physicist and academic, Nobel Prize laureate (d. 1995)
1905 – Helen Wills, American tennis player and painter (d. 1998)
1906 – Janet Gaynor, American actress (d. 1984)
  1906   – Taffy O'Callaghan, Welsh footballer and coach (d. 1946)
1908 – Carole Lombard, American actress (d. 1942)
  1908   – Sergei Sobolev, Russian mathematician and academic (d. 1989)
1910 – Barbara Castle, English journalist and politician, First Secretary of State (d. 2002)
  1910   – Orazio Satta Puliga, Italian automobile designer (d. 1974)
1912 – Perkins Bass, American lawyer and politician (d. 2011)
1913 – Méret Oppenheim, German-Swiss painter and photographer (d. 1985)
1914 – Thor Heyerdahl, Norwegian ethnographer and explorer (d. 2002)
  1914   – Joan Littlewood, English director and playwright (d. 2002)
1915 – Carolyn Goodman, American psychologist and activist (d. 2007)
  1915   – Humberto Sousa Medeiros, Portuguese-American cardinal (d. 1983)
  1915   – Alice Timander, Swedish dentist and actress (d. 2007)
1916 – Chiang Wei-kuo, Japanese-Chinese general (d. 1997)
1917 – Fannie Lou Hamer, American activist and philanthropist (d. 1977)
1918 – Goh Keng Swee, Singaporean soldier and politician, 2nd Deputy Prime Minister of Singapore (d. 2010)
  1918   – André Pilette, French-Belgian race car driver (d. 1993)
1919 – Tommy Lawton, English footballer and coach (d. 1996)
1920 – John Donaldson, Baron Donaldson of Lymington, English lawyer and judge (d. 2005)
1921 – Evgenii Landis, Ukrainian-Russian mathematician and theorist (d. 1997)
  1921   – Joseph Lowery, American minister and activist (d. 2020)
1922 – Joe Frazier, American baseball player and manager (d. 2011)
  1922   – Teala Loring, American actress (d. 2007)
1923 – Robert Kuok, Malaysian Chinese business magnate and investor
  1923   – Yaşar Kemal, Turkish journalist and author (d. 2015)
1925 – Shana Alexander, American journalist and author (d. 2005)
1927 – Bill King, American sportscaster (d. 2005)
1928 – Flora MacNeil, Scottish Gaelic singer (d. 2015)
  1928   – Barbara Werle, American actress and singer (d. 2013)
1929 – George Mattos, American pole vaulter (d. 2012)
1930 – Hafez al-Assad, Syrian general and politician, 20th President of Syria (d. 2000)
  1930   – Richie Benaud, Australian cricketer and sportscaster (d. 2015)
1931 – Nikolai Chernykh, Russian astronomer (d. 2004)
  1931   – Eileen Derbyshire, English actress
  1931   – Riccardo Giacconi, Italian-American astrophysicist and astronomer, Nobel Prize laureate (d. 2018)
1933 – Prince Mukarram Jah, 8th Nizam of Hyderabad (d. 2023)
1934 – Marshall Rosenberg, American psychologist and author (d. 2015)
1935 – Bruno Sammartino, Italian-American wrestler and trainer (d. 2018)
1936 – Julius L. Chambers, American lawyer, educator, and activist (d. 2013)
1938 – Serge Nubret, Caribbean-French bodybuilder and actor (d. 2011)
1939 – Melvyn Bragg, English journalist, author, and academic
  1939   – Jack Cullen, American baseball player
  1939   – Richard Delgado, American lawyer and academic
  1939   – Sheila Greibach, American computer scientist and academic
  1939   – John J. LaFalce, American captain, lawyer, and politician
1940 – Jan Keizer, Dutch footballer and referee
1941 – Paul Popham, American soldier and activist, co-founded Gay Men's Health Crisis (d. 1987)
1942 – Dan Christensen, American painter (d. 2007)
  1942   – Britt Ekland, Swedish actress and singer
  1942   – Fred Travalena, American comedian and actor (d. 2009)
1943 – Richard Caborn, English engineer and politician, Minister for Sport and the Olympics
  1943   – Peter Dowding, Australian politician, 24th Premier of Western Australia
  1943   – Alexander Maxovich Shilov, Russian painter
  1943   – Cees Veerman, Dutch singer-songwriter and guitarist (d. 2014)
1944 – Merzak Allouache, Algerian director and screenwriter
  1944   – Patrick Cordingley, English general
  1944   – Boris Mikhailov, Russian ice hockey player and coach
  1944   – Carlos Pace, Brazilian race car driver (d. 1977)
1945 – Ivan Graziani, Italian singer-songwriter and guitarist (d. 1997)
1946 – Lloyd Doggett, American lawyer and politician
  1946   – Tony Greig, South African-English cricketer and sportscaster (d. 2012)
  1946   – John Monie, Australian rugby league player and coach
  1946   – Eddie Villanueva, Filipino evangelist and politician, founded the ZOE Broadcasting Network
  1946   – Vinod Khanna, Indian actor, producer and politician (d. 2017)
1947 – Patxi Andión, Spanish singer-songwriter and actor (d. 2019)
  1947   – Klaus Dibiasi, Italian diver
  1947   – Millie Small, Jamaican singer-songwriter (d. 2020)
1948 – Gerry Adams, Irish republican politician
  1948   – Glenn Branca, American guitarist and composer (d. 2018) 
1949 – Lonnie Johnson, American inventor 
  1949   – Penny Junor, English journalist and author
  1949   – Thomas McClary, American R&B singer-songwriter and guitarist
  1949   – Leslie Moonves, American businessman
  1949   – Nicolas Peyrac, French singer-songwriter and photographer
1950 – David Brin, American physicist and author
1951 – Kevin Cronin, American singer-songwriter, guitarist, and producer 
  1951   – Clive Rees, Singaporean-Welsh rugby player and educator
  1951   – Gavin Sutherland, Scottish singer-songwriter and bass player
  1951   – Manfred Winkelhock, German race car driver (d. 1985)
1952 – Ayten Mutlu, Turkish poet and author
1953 – Rein Rannap, Estonian pianist and composer
1954 – Bill Buford, American author and journalist
  1954   – David Hidalgo, American singer-songwriter and guitarist 
1955 – Tony Dungy, American football player and coach
1956 – Sadiq al-Ahmar, Yemeni politician
  1956   – Kathleen Webb, American author and illustrator
1957 – Bruce Grobbelaar, Zimbabwean footballer and coach
1959 – Turki bin Sultan, Saudi Arabian politician (d. 2012)
  1959   – Oil Can Boyd, American baseball player
  1959   – Brian Higgins, American politician
  1959   – Walter Ray Williams, Jr., American bowler
1961 – Miyuki Matsuda, Japanese actress
  1961   – Paul Sansome, English footballer
  1961   – Ben Summerskill, English businessman and journalist
1962 – David Baker, American biologist and academic
  1962   – Rich Yett, American baseball player
1963 – Sven Andersson, Swedish footballer and coach
  1963   – Elisabeth Shue, American actress
1964 – Ricky Berry, American basketball player (d. 1989)
  1964   – Mark Field, German-English lawyer and politician
  1964   – Tom Jager, American swimmer and coach
  1964   – Miltos Manetas, Greek painter
  1964   – Knut Storberget, Norwegian lawyer and politician, Norwegian Minister of Justice
  1964   – Matthew Sweet, American singer-songwriter, guitarist, and producer 
1965 – Jürgen Kohler,  German footballer and manager 
  1965   – Peg O'Connor, American philosopher and academic
  1965   – Steve Scalise, American lawyer and politician
  1965   – Rubén Sierra, Puerto Rican-American baseball player
  1965   – John McWhorter, American academic and linguist 
1966 – Melania Mazzucco, Italian author
  1966   – Jacqueline Obradors, American actress
  1966   – Niall Quinn, Irish footballer and manager
  1966   – Tommy Stinson, American singer-songwriter and bass player
1967 – Kennet Andersson, Swedish footballer
  1967   – Svend Karlsen, Norwegian strongman and bodybuilder
  1967   – Steven Woolfe, English barrister and politician
1968 – Bjarne Goldbæk, Danish footballer and sportscaster
  1968   – Bob May, American golfer
1969 – Byron Black, Zimbabwean golfer
  1969   – Muhammad V of Kelantan, Yang di-Pertuan Agong of Malaysia
1970 – Maria Kannegaard, Danish-Norwegian pianist and composer
  1970   – Shauna MacDonald, Canadian actress and producer
  1970   – Darren Oliver, American baseball player
  1970   – Amy Jo Johnson, American actress
1971 – Phil Bennett, English race car driver
  1971   – Takis Gonias, Greek footballer and manager
  1971   – Alan Stubbs, English footballer, coach, and manager
1972 – Daniel Cavanagh, English singer-songwriter and guitarist 
  1972   – Anders Iwers, Swedish bass player 
  1972   – Jarrod Moseley, Australian golfer
  1972   – Mark Schwarzer, Australian footballer
  1972   – Ryu Si-won, South Korean actor and singer
  1972   – Ko So-young, South Korean model and actress
1973 – Jeff B. Davis, American comedian, actor, and singer
  1973   – Ioan Gruffudd, Welsh actor
  1973   – Sylvain Legwinski, French footballer and manager
  1973   – Rebecca Lobo, American basketball player and sportscaster
1974 – Walter Centeno, Costa Rican footballer and manager
  1974   – Kenny Jönsson, Swedish ice hockey player and coach
  1974   – Seema Kennedy, British politician
  1974   – Jeremy Sisto, American actor, producer, and screenwriter
  1974   – Hoàng Xuân Vinh, Vietnamese shooter
1975 – Reon King, Guyanese cricketer
1976 – Freddy García, Venezuelan baseball player
  1976   – Magdalena Kučerová, Czech-German tennis player
  1976   – Stefan Postma, Dutch footballer and coach
1977 – Daniel Brière, Canadian ice hockey player
  1977   – Melinda Doolittle, American singer-songwriter
  1977   – Shimon Gershon, Israeli footballer and singer
  1977   – Jamie Laurie, American singer-songwriter 
  1977   – Vladimir Manchev, Bulgarian footballer and manager
1978 – Carolina Gynning, Swedish model, actress, and singer
  1978   – Ricky Hatton, English boxer and promoter
  1978   – Liu Yang, Chinese astronaut
1979 – David Di Tommaso, French footballer (d. 2005)
  1979   – Mohamed Kallon, Sierra Leonean footballer and manager  
  1979   – Richard Seymour, American football player
  1979   – Pascal van Assendelft, Dutch sprinter
1980 – Arnaud Coyot, French cyclist (d. 2013)
  1980   – Wes Durston, English cricketer
  1980   – Abdoulaye Méïté, French footballer
1981 – Zurab Khizanishvili, Georgian footballer
  1981   – José Luis Perlaza, Ecuadorian footballer
1982 – Levon Aronian, Armenian chess grandmaster
  1982   – Latonia Blackman, Barbadian netball player
  1982   – William Butler, American musician and composer 
  1982   – Fábio Júnior dos Santos, Brazilian footballer
  1982   – Hideki Mutoh, Japanese race car driver
  1982   – Paul Smith, English boxer
1983 – Renata Voráčová, Czech tennis player
1984 – Morné Morkel, South African cricketer
  1984   – Joanna Pacitti, American singer-songwriter 
1985 – Mitchell Cole, English footballer (d. 2012)
  1985   – Sylvia Fowles, American basketball player
  1985   – Sandra Góngora, Mexican ten-pin bowler
  1985   – Tarmo Kink, Estonian footballer
1986 – Meg Myers, American singer-songwriter and guitarist
  1986   – Olivia Thirlby, American actress
1987 – Joe Lewis, English footballer
  1987   – Akuila Uate, Fijian-Australian rugby league player
1988 – Trey Edward Shults, American film director
1989 – Albert Ebossé Bodjongo, Cameroonian footballer (d. 2014)
  1989   – Tyler Ennis, Canadian ice hockey player
  1989   – Pizzi, Portuguese footballer
1990 – Han Sun-hwa, South Korean singer and actress 
1992 – Taylor Paris, Canadian rugby player
1993 – Adam Gemili, English sprinter
  1993   – Joe Rafferty, English-Irish footballer
  1993   – Jourdan Miller, American fashion model
1994 – Lee Joo-heon, South Korean rapper and songwriter
1997 – Kasper Dolberg, Danish footballer
1999 – Niko Kari, Finnish race car driver
 1999 – Trevor Lawrence, American football player
2000 – Kyle Pitts, American football player
 2000 – Jazz Jennings, American internet personality
  2000   – Addison Rae, American social media personality, dancer, and singer
2004 – Bronny James, American basketball player

Deaths

Pre-1600
AD 23 – Wang Mang, emperor of the Xin Dynasty
404 – Aelia Eudoxia, Byzantine empress
 836 – Nicetas the Patrician, Byzantine general
 869 – Ermentrude of Orléans, Frankish queen (b. 823)
 877 – Charles the Bald, Holy Roman Emperor (b. 823)
 997 – Minamoto no Mitsunaka, Japanese samurai (b. 912)
1014 – Samuel, tsar of the Bulgarian Empire
1019 – Frederick of Luxembourg, count of Moselgau (b. 965)
1145 – Baldwin, archbishop of Pisa
1090 – Adalbero, bishop of Würzburg
1101 – Bruno of Cologne, German monk, founded the Carthusian Order
1173 – Engelbert III, margrave of Istria
1349 – Joan II of Navarre, daughter of Louis X of France (b. 1312)
1398 – Jeong Dojeon, Korean prime minister (b. 1342)
1413 – Dawit I, ruler (Emperor) of Ethiopia (b. 1382)
1536 – William Tyndale, English Protestant Bible translator (b. c. 1494)
1553 – Şehzade Mustafa, Ottoman prince (b. 1515)
1559 – William I, Count of Nassau-Siegen, German count (b. 1487)

1601–1900
1640 – Wolrad IV, Count of Waldeck-Eisenberg (b. 1588)
1641 – Matthijs Quast, Dutch explorer
1644 – Elisabeth of France, queen of Spain and Portugal (b. 1602)
1660 – Paul Scarron, French poet and author (b. 1610)
1661 – Guru Har Rai, Indian 7th Sikh guru (b. 1630)
1688 – Christopher Monck, 2nd Duke of Albemarle, English soldier and politician, Lieutenant Governor of Jamaica (b. 1652)
1762 – Francesco Manfredini, Italian violinist and composer (b. 1684)
1819 – Charles Emmanuel IV, king of Sardinia (b. 1751)
1829 – Pierre Derbigny, French-American politician, 6th Governor of Louisiana (b. 1769)
1836 – Johannes Jelgerhuis, Dutch painter and actor (b. 1770)
1873 – Paweł Strzelecki, Polish-English geologist and explorer (b. 1797)
1883 – Dục Đức, Vietnamese emperor (b. 1852)
1891 – Charles Stewart Parnell, Irish politician (b. 1846)
1892 – Alfred, Lord Tennyson, English poet (b. 1809)

1901–present
1912 – Auguste Beernaert, Belgian politician, 14th Prime Minister of Belgium, Nobel Prize laureate (b. 1829)
1923 – Damat Ferid Pasha, Ottoman politician, 285th Grand Vizier of the Ottoman Empire (b. 1853)
1942 – Siegmund Glücksmann, German politician (b. 1884)
1945 – Leonardo Conti, German SS officer (b. 1900)
1947 – Leevi Madetoja, Finnish composer and critic (b. 1887)
1951 – Will Keith Kellogg, American businessman, founded the Kellogg Company (b. 1860)
  1951   – Otto Fritz Meyerhof, German-American physician and biochemist, Nobel Prize laureate (b. 1884)
1959 – Bernard Berenson, American historian and author (b. 1865)
1962 – Tod Browning, American actor, director, screenwriter (b. 1880)
1968 – Phyllis Nicolson, English mathematician and physicist (b. 1917)
1969 – Walter Hagen, American golfer (b. 1892)
  1969   – Otto Steinböck, Austrian zoologist (b. 1893)
1972 – Cléo de Verberena, Brazilian actress and film director (born c. 1909)
1973 – Sidney Blackmer, American actor (b. 1895)
  1973   – François Cevert, French race car driver (b. 1944)
  1973   – Dick Laan, Dutch actor, screenwriter, and author (b. 1894)
  1973   – Dennis Price, English actor (b. 1915)
  1973   – Margaret Wilson, American missionary and author (b. 1882)
1974 – Helmuth Koinigg, Austrian race car driver (b. 1948)
1976 – Gilbert Ryle, English philosopher and author (b. 1900)
1978 – Johnny O'Keefe, Australian singer-songwriter (b. 1935)
1979 – Elizabeth Bishop, American poet and short-story writer (b. 1911)
1980 – Hattie Jacques, English actress and producer (b. 1922)
  1980   – Jean Robic, French cyclist (b. 1921)
1981 – Anwar Sadat, Egyptian colonel and politician, 3rd President of Egypt, Nobel Prize laureate (b. 1918)
1983 – Terence Cooke, American cardinal (b. 1921)
1985 – Nelson Riddle, American composer, conductor, and bandleader (b. 1921)
1986 – Alexander Kronrod, Russian mathematician and computer scientist (b. 1921)
1989 – Bette Davis, American actress (b. 1908)
1990 – Bahriye Üçok, Turkish sociologist and politician (b. 1919)
1991 – Igor Talkov, Russian singer-songwriter (b. 1956)
1992 – Denholm Elliott, English actor (b. 1922)
  1992   – Bill O'Reilly, Australian cricketer and sportscaster (b. 1905)
1993 – Nejat Eczacıbaşı, Turkish chemist, businessman, and philanthropist, founded Eczacıbaşı (b. 1913)
  1993   – Larry Walters, American truck driver and pilot (b. 1949)
1995 – Benoît Chamoux, French mountaineer (b. 1961)
1997 – Johnny Vander Meer, American baseball player and manager (b. 1914)
1998 – Mark Belanger, American baseball player (b. 1944)
1999 – Amália Rodrigues, Portuguese singer and actress (b. 1920)
  1999   – Gorilla Monsoon, American wrestler and sportscaster (b. 1937)
2000 – Richard Farnsworth, American actor and stuntman (b. 1920)
2001 – Arne Harris, American director and producer (b. 1934)
2002 – Prince Claus of the Netherlands (b. 1926)
2006 – Bertha Brouwer, Dutch sprinter (b. 1930)
  2006   – Eduardo Mignogna, Argentinian director and screenwriter (b. 1940)
  2006   – Buck O'Neil, American baseball player and manager (b. 1911)
  2006   – Wilson Tucker, American author and critic (b. 1914)
2007 – Babasaheb Bhosale, Indian lawyer and politician, 8th Chief Minister of Maharashtra (d. 1921)
  2007   – Laxmi Mall Singhvi, Indian scholar, jurist, and politician (b. 1931)
2008 – Peter Cox, Australian public servant and politician (b. 1925)
2009 – Douglas Campbell, Scottish-Canadian actor and screenwriter (b. 1922)
2010 – Rhys Isaac, South-African-Australian historian and author (b. 1937)
  2010   – Antonie Kamerling, Dutch television and film actor, and musician (b. 1966)
2011 – Diane Cilento, Australian actress and author (b. 1933)
2012 – Chadli Bendjedid, Algerian colonel and politician, 3rd President of Algeria (b. 1929)
  2012   – Anthony John Cooke, English organist and composer (b. 1931)
  2012   – Nick Curran, American singer-songwriter, guitarist, and producer (b. 1977)
  2012   – Albert, Margrave of Meissen (b. 1943)
  2012   – Joseph Meyer, American lawyer and politician, 19th Secretary of State of Wyoming (b. 1941)
  2012   – B. Satya Narayan Reddy, Indian lawyer and politician, 19th Governor of West Bengal (b. 1927)
  2012   – J. J. C. Smart, English-Australian philosopher and academic (b. 1920)
2013 – Ulysses Curtis, American-Canadian football player and coach (b. 1926)
  2013   – Rift Fournier, American screenwriter and producer (b. 1936)
  2013   – Paul Rogers, English actor (b. 1917)
  2013   – Nico van Kampen, Dutch physicist and academic (b. 1921)
2014 – Vic Braden, American tennis player and coach (b. 1929)
  2014   – Igor Mitoraj, German-Polish sculptor (b. 1944)
  2014   – Diane Nyland, Canadian actress, director and choreographer (b. 1944)
  2014   – Marian Seldes, American actress (b. 1928)
  2014   – Serhiy Zakarlyuka, Ukrainian footballer and manager (b. 1976)
  2014   – Feridun Buğeker, Turkish football player (b. 1933)
2015 – Árpád Göncz, Hungarian author, playwright, and politician, 1st President of Hungary (b. 1922)
  2015   – Vladimir Shlapentokh, Ukrainian-American sociologist, historian, political scientist, and academic (b. 1926)
  2015   – Juan Vicente Ugarte del Pino, Peruvian historian, lawyer, and jurist (b. 1923)
2017 – Ralphie May, American stand-up comedian and actor (b. 1972)
  2017   – David Marks, British architect, designer of the London Eye (b. 1952)
2018 – Scott Wilson, American actor (b. 1942)
  2018   – Montserrat Caballé, Spanish soprano (b. 1933)
2019 – Ginger Baker, English drummer (b. 1939)
  2019   – Eddie Lumsden, Australian rugby league player (b. 1936)
  2019   – Rip Taylor, American actor and comedian (b. 1931)
2020 – Eddie Van Halen, Dutch-American guitarist, songwriter, and producer (b. 1955)
  2020   – Johnny Nash, American singer-songwriter (b. 1940)

Holidays and observances
Christian feast day:
Blessed Marie Rose Durocher
Blessed Juan de Palafox y Mendoza
Bruno of Cologne
Faith
Mary Frances of the Five Wounds
Pardulphus
Sagar of Laodicea
October 6 (Eastern Orthodox liturgics)
William Tyndale (commemoration, Anglicanism), with Myles Coverdale (Episcopal Church (USA))
World Space Week (October 4–10)
Day of Commemoration and National Mourning (Turkmenistan)
Dukla Pass Victims Day (Slovakia)
German-American Day (United States)
Memorial Day for the Martyrs of Arad (Hungary)
Teachers' Day (Sri Lanka)
Yom Kippur War commemorations:
Armed Forces Day (Egypt)
Tishreen Liberation Day (Syria)

References

External links

 
 
 

Days of the year
October